T.B. Seath & Co. was a  shipbuilding company in Scotland established in 1856 by Thomas Bollen Seath (1820–1903) at a bend on the south bank of the River Clyde at Shawfield, Rutherglen; his previous premises near Partick were taken over by A. & J. Inglis. For a time he operated a service taking passengers downriver to central Glasgow. The company’s speciality was small iron-hulled steamboats and yachts including those used in the Clutha ferry service.

The yard produced more than 300 vessels, some of which have survived and are in service into the 21st century.
The Seath business closed in 1902 after a tidal weir was installed on the river east of Albert Bridge, blocking access to the sea from Rutherglen. Other firms continued to use the yard until 1923. Seath is interred in a prominent tomb at the nearby Southern Necropolis.

List of ships built by T.B. Seath & Co

References

External links
Painting of Seath's boatyard, artist unknown, hosted at Art UK (work itself held at Hamilton Low Parks Museum)
Painting of Seath's boatyard, 1890 by Thomas Grant, hosted at Art UK (work itself held at Hamilton Low Parks Museum)

Defunct shipbuilding companies of Scotland
1856 establishments in Scotland
1902 disestablishments in Scotland
Companies based in South Lanarkshire
River Clyde
British companies established in 1856
British companies disestablished in 1902
Rutherglen
History of South Lanarkshire